Mike McCarthy is a draftsman by profession and is a Gaelic footballer with the Kerry senior football team. He also currently plays at club level with Kilcummin in Kerry.

Playing career
McCarthy filled a gap for Kerry, who lacked a specialist full-back of true inter-county class and had been forced to deploy the great half-back Séamus Moynihan in that position before McCarthy claimed the No.3 jersey.

McCarthy won the All-Ireland senior football championship with Kerry on four occasions, in 2000, 2004, 2006 and again in 2009. He will be remembered for his total containment of Conor Mortimer during the 2006 final against Mayo, in his final game of inter-county football. It proved to be an easy win for Kerry. McCarthy retired from inter-county football after that season but made a comeback during 2009. Michael won the All-Ireland U21 football championship with Kerry in 1998. He has also won two NFL division one titles with Kerry in 2004 and 2006. Michael McCarthy has three All-Stars which were awarded in 2000, 2004 and 2005.

External links
 Mike McCarthy Retires

Year of birth missing (living people)
Living people
All Stars Awards winners (football)
Gaelic football backs
Kerry inter-county Gaelic footballers
Kilcummin Gaelic footballers
Winners of four All-Ireland medals (Gaelic football)